The 1938–39 FA Cup was the 64th season of the world's oldest football cup competition, the Football Association Challenge Cup, commonly known as the FA Cup. Portsmouth won the competition for the first time, beating Wolverhampton Wanderers 4–1 in the final at Wembley. As this was the last full FA Cup competition before the Second World War, Portsmouth held the trophy until the end of the 1945–46 season.

Matches were scheduled to be played at the stadium of the team named first on the date specified for each round, which was always a Saturday. Some matches, however, might be rescheduled for other days if there were clashes with games for other competitions or the weather was inclement. If scores were level after 90 minutes had been played, a replay would take place at the stadium of the second-named team later the same week. If the replayed match was drawn further replays would be held until a winner was determined. If scores were level after 90 minutes had been played in a replay, a 30-minute period of extra time would be played.

Calendar

First round proper
At this stage, 41 clubs from the Football League Third Division North and South joined the 25 non-league clubs having come through the qualifying rounds. Barnsley, York City and Notts County were given a bye to the Third Round. To make the number of matches up, non-league Scarborough and Bromley were given byes to this round. 34 matches were scheduled to be played on Saturday, 26 November 1938. Eight were drawn and went to replays in the following midweek fixture.

Second Round Proper
The matches were played on Saturday, 10 December 1938. Four matches were drawn, with replays taking place in the following midweek fixture. One of these, Halifax Town vs. Mansfield Town, then went to two more replays before being settled.

Third round proper
The 44 First and Second Division clubs entered the competition at this stage, along with Barnsley, York City and Notts County. The matches were scheduled for Saturday, 7 January 1939, although seven matches began at later dates. Eight matches were drawn and went to replays, with one of these requiring a second replay to settle the fixture.

Fourth round proper
The matches were scheduled for Saturday, 21 January 1939. Five games were drawn and went to replays, of which two went to a second replay.

Fifth round proper
The matches were scheduled for Saturday, 11 February 1939. There were four replays, of which two went to second replays.

Sixth round proper
The four Sixth Round ties were scheduled to be played on Saturday, 4 March 1939. There was one replay, in the Huddersfield Town–Blackburn Rovers match.

Semi-finals
The semi-final matches were played on Saturday, 25 March 1939. Wolverhampton Wanderers and Portsmouth won their matches to meet in the final at Wembley.

Final

The 1939 FA Cup Final was contested by Portsmouth and Wolverhampton Wanderers at Wembley. Portsmouth won 4–1, with goals from Bert Barlow, John Anderson and two by Cliff Parker. Dicky Dorsett scored Wolves' effort.

As a result of the suspension of the FA Cup for the duration of the Second World War, the next FA Cup final was not until seven years later in 1946, thereby enabling Portsmouth fans to claim that their team has held the Cup for the longest time.

Match details

See also
FA Cup Final Results 1872-

References
General
Official site; fixtures and results service at TheFA.com
1938-39 FA Cup at rsssf.com
1938-39 FA Cup at soccerbase.com

Specific

FA Cup seasons
Fa Cup
FA